Shorty is a nickname, usually for a short person. See Shorty (nickname).

Shorty may also refer to:

Music

Artists
 Ras Shorty I, Trinidadian artist and founder of soca music.
 Shorty (band), an American rock band formed in 1991
 Shorty (American rapper), Member of Platinum recording group Da Lench Mob.
 Shorty (Croatian rapper) (born 1980)
 Shorty (MC), member of Boy Better Know
 Shorty da Prince (born 1989), American radio DJ, rapper, and television personality
 Buckshot Shorty (born 1974), member of the hip hop trio Black Moon
 Magnolia Shorty (1982–2010), American rapper
 Guitar Shorty (born 1939), American blues guitarist David William Kearney
 Trombone Shorty (born 1986), stage name of American jazz musician Troy Andrews

Songs
 "Shorty" (song), by The Get Up Kids
 "Shorty (You Keep Playin' with My Mind)", 1998 debut single from R&B group Imajin
 "Shorty" (Casa de Leones song)
 "Shorty" (Future and Juice Wrld song)

Film and television
 Shorty (film), a 2002 independent comedy film
 Shorty, a nickname for the New Zealand soap opera Shortland Street

Characters
 Shorty Meeks, a character in the Scary Movie franchise
 Shorty, a character in The Land Before Time animated film series
 Shorty, a character from  Eddie Lawrence's 1960s cartoon film series
 Shorty, title character of Shorty McShorts' Shorts, a Disney Channel animated TV series
 Shorty Kellums, a recurring character on the TV series The Beverly Hillbillies
 Shorty, any of a race of fictional cucumber-sized people in the Dunno children's books by Nikolay Nosov

Other uses
 Shorty (crater), on the Moon
 Nokia Shorty, a common name for the Nokia 2115i mobile phone
 Shorty, a type of wetsuit
 Shorty Awards, awards for excellence in social media
 Shorty's Lunch, a Washington, Pennsylvania, hot dog lunch counter
 Shorty (slang), American slang
 Shorty G and Shorty Gable, ring names of Chad Gable (born 1986), American professional wrestler

See also
 Shortie (babydoll), a short, sleeveless, loose-fitting nightgown or negligee, intended as nightwear for women
 Shawty (disambiguation)